Vorsma is a town in Pavlovsky District of Nizhny Novgorod Oblast, Russia, located on the Kishma River (Oka's tributary),  southwest of Nizhny Novgorod, the administrative center of the oblast. Population:

History
The village of Vorsma was first mentioned in the 16th century. It was granted town status in 1955.

Administrative and municipal status
Within the framework of administrative divisions, it is incorporated within Pavlovsky District as the town of district significance of Vorsma. As a municipal division, the town of district significance of Vorsma is incorporated within Pavlovsky Municipal District as Vorsma Urban Settlement.

References

Notes

Sources

Cities and towns in Nizhny Novgorod Oblast
Pavlovsky District, Nizhny Novgorod Oblast